Sandbrook is a surname. Notable people with the surname include:

 Dominic Sandbrook (born 1974), British historian, author, columnist, and television presenter
 Ian Sandbrook (born 1983), New Zealand cricketer 
 Richard Sandbrook (1946–2005), British administrator